Charlotte Jane Mendelson (born 1 November 1972) is an English novelist and editor. She was placed 60th on the Independent on Sunday Pink List 2007.

Biography
Charlotte Mendelson was born on 1 November 1972 in London, the daughter of a barrister, Maurice Harvey Mendelson. Mendelson's family moved to Oxford when she was two, where her father taught at St John's College, Oxford. She attended Oxford High School and New College, Oxford where she received a BA in Ancient and Modern History. She was an editor at Jonathan Cape in 1996–1997 and at the Headline Review in 1998–2014.

Mendelson has been a visiting professor of creative writing at Royal Holloway, University of London since 2017 and a gardening correspondent at the New Yorker since the same year. She became a Fellow of the Royal Society of Literature in 2018.

Bibliography
Love in Idleness (2001)
Daughters of Jerusalem (2003)
When We Were Bad (2007)
Almost English (2013)
Rhapsody In Green (2016)
The Exhibitionist (2022)

Awards and nominations
John Llewellyn Rhys Prize
Somerset Maugham Award
Sunday Times 'Young Writer of the Year (shortlisted)
London Arts New London Writers’ Award
K. Blundell Trust Award
Le Prince Maurice Roman d’Amour Prize (shortlisted)
Geoffrey Faber Memorial Prize (shortlisted)
Man Booker Prize 2013 (longlisted)
Baileys Women's Prize for Fiction 2014 (longlisted)
Women's Prize for Fiction 2022 (longlisted for The Exhibitionist)

Personal life
Mendelson lives in London. She has one son and one daughter.

References

External links
Charlotte Mendelson Official Website
Charlotte Mendelson at Picador
Somethingjewish.co.uk interview

1972 births
21st-century English novelists
Living people
English Jews
John Llewellyn Rhys Prize winners
English lesbian writers
LGBT Jews
Alumni of the University of Oxford
Alumni of New College, Oxford
People educated at Oxford High School, England
English LGBT novelists
English women novelists
21st-century English women writers
21st-century LGBT people